Francisc Mészáros (also known as Ferenc Mészáros; 5 May 1919 – 21 September 1977) was a footballer who played international football for both Hungary and Romania. He played as a defender for Dorogi, Tokodi Üveggyári SC, Újpest, Nagyváradi, Vasas, Libertatea, IT Arad and Braga. He managed the Syrian national team in 1954 and the Iranian national team in 1959.

Honours
Nagyváradi
Nemzeti Bajnokság I: 1943–44
IT Arad
Liga I: 1946–47

References

External links

Francisc Mészáros at Labtof 

1919 births
1977 deaths
People from Nové Zámky District
Sportspeople from the Nitra Region
Hungarian footballers
Hungary international footballers
Romanian footballers
Romania international footballers
Dual internationalists (football)
Dorogi FC footballers
Újpest FC players
CA Oradea players
Vasas SC players
FC UTA Arad players
S.C. Braga players
Nemzeti Bajnokság I players
Liga I players
Primeira Liga players
Association football defenders
Expatriate footballers in Portugal
Romanian expatriate footballers
Romanian expatriate sportspeople in Portugal
Hungarian expatriate footballers
Hungarian expatriate sportspeople in Portugal
Romanian expatriate football managers
Hungarian expatriate football managers
Expatriate football managers in Syria
Expatriate football managers in Iran
Expatriate football managers in Nicaragua
Expatriate football managers in Guatemala
Romanian football managers
Hungarian football managers
Syria national football team managers
Iran national football team managers
Nicaragua national football team managers
Club Xelajú MC managers